Gajdusek is a surname. Notable people with the surname include:

Miroslav Gajdůšek (born 1951), Czech footballer 
Daniel Carleton Gajdusek (1923–2008), American physician and medical researcher
Vilém Gajdušek (1895–1977), Czech optician and telescope designer

See also
3603 Gajdušek